William J. Sharkey (20 March 1885 – 5 October 1918) was an officer in the United States Navy during World War I.

Biography
Born in Auburn, New York, Sharkey attained the enlisted rate of Chief Gunners Mate. He was appointed Ensign on 15 March 1918 and assigned to the submarine .

On 5 October 1918, fumes were reported in the after battery room, and Lieutenant (junior grade) Sharkey was killed as he tried to prevent the explosion that followed.

Namesake
  was named for him.
 Sharkey Theatre, Joint Base Pearl Harbor–Hickam

References

1885 births
1918 deaths
United States Navy officers
People from Auburn, New York
United States Navy personnel of World War I
American military personnel killed in World War I